Alan H. DeCherney is an Obstetrician and Gynecologist who specializes in reproductive endocrinology & infertility.  He is experienced in reproductive and endocrinology, infertility, and reproductive genetics.

Dr. DeCherney earned a B.A. from Muhlenberg College and an M.D. from Temple University. He did his residency at the University of Pennsylvania and internship at the University of Pittsburgh; he was also a research fellow at the Lister Institute in London, England. From 1982 to 1991, DeCherney directed the Reproductive Endocrinology division at Yale University. Then he worked as the director of the Reproductive Endocrinology division at the University of California, Los Angeles from 1996 to 2006.

He is a Fellow of the American College of Obstetricians and Gynecologists.
He has served as president of the American Society for Reproductive Medicine (ASRM), the Society for Reproductive Endocrinology and Infertility (SREI), the Society of Reproductive Surgeons (SRS), the Society of Assisted Reproductive Technology, and the Society for Gynecologic Investigation. He also served as the Editor in chief for Fertility and Sterility from 1997 to 2011, and publish numerous articles that help shape the field of REI.

He was formerly the John Slate Ely Professor of Obstetrics and Gynecology at Yale University, the Phaneuf Professor and Chair of Obstetrics and Gynecology at Tufts University, the president of the American Society for Reproductive Medicine. Currently he works as Director of the Program in Reproductive and Adult Endocrinology and Chief, Reproductive Biology and Medicine Branch of the Eunice Kennedy Shriver National Institute of child Health and Human Development (NICHD) of the National Institutes of Health.

Dr. DeCherney was a pioneer when IVF was first performed successfully in the United States.  He was among a handful of physicians who treated some of the earliest patients.  Over the years, Dr. DeCherney has mentored more than 100 Reproductive Endocrinologists.

List of Firsts 
Dr. DeCherney have pioneered many never before done treatments and procedures that are now fundamental in the field of reproductive endocrinology & infertility.

Medical 

 First Ectopic Pregnancy removal with a Laparoscopes
 Mention of Discriminatory Zone for Diagnosis Ectopic Pregnancy
 Endometrial Ablation with Wire Loop
 Hyskon Pump
 IVF High Dose HMG
 Started Minimally Invasive Surgery at Yale University
 First Sonohysterogram
 Withered tube (DES)
 Paper on Aging and Fertility (NEJM)
 CASA (Computer Assisted Sperm Analysis)
 First IVF Program in the Northeast, 5th in the country
 Intercede to prevent adhesions
 Empiric treatment of endometriosis
 Vaginal Probe Guide for Egg Aspiration
 Empiric IUI and HMG
 Oil soluble vs Water Soluble dye for hysterosalpingograms increasing fertility
 Homotransplantation of the human fallopian tubes
 MRI of uterine anomalies
 REI Match
 REI Fellow's Retreat
 SART Registry - 2nd President Validation Committee Chair for the CDC
 New England Journal of Medicine, Associate Editor (First OB/GYN)
 First OB/GYN as a Branch chief at the NIH

Honors

Academic Appointments 

 Instructor, Department of OB/GYN, University of Pennsylvania School of Medicine
 Professor of OB/GYN, Yale University School of Medicine
 Director, Division of Reproductive Endocrinology, Department of OB/GYN, Yale University School of Medicine
 Professor of Gynecology and Obstetrics and Chairman of the Department, Tufts University School of Medicine
 Professor of Gynecology and Obstetrics, and Chairman of the Department, UCLA School of Medicine
 Chair (Executive) of Obstetrics and Gynecology at the David Geffen School of Medicine at UCLA
 Chief of Division of Reproductive Endocrinology and Infertility at the David Geffen School of Medicine at UCLA
 Professor Emeritus, the David Geffen School of Medicine at UCLA
 Chief and Senior Investigator, Reproductive Endocrinology, Infertility and Gynecology Branch and Deputy Clinical Director for Academic Affairs at Eunice Kennedy Shriveer National Institute of Child Health and Human Development, National Institutes of Health

Professional Organizations 
- American Assembly, Columbia University

- American Association of Gynecologic Laparoscopists (AAGL)

- American Association of Obstetricians and Gynecologists Foundation

- American Association for History of Medicine

- American College of Obstetricians and Gynecologist (ACOG)

- American College of Surgeons

- American Society for Reproductive Medicine

- Supreme Court Historical Society

- Preimplantation Genetic Diagnosis Special Interest Group (PGD SIG)

- Academy of Medicine of Washington DC

- American Gynecological Club

- American Gynecological and Obstetrical Society

- European Society of Human Reproduction and Embryology

- National Academy of Medicine

- Pacific Coast Fertility Society

- Society for Reproductive Investigation

- Society of Gynecologic Surgeons

- Society for the Study of Reproduction

Press Mentions 

 Giants in Obstetrics and Gynecology Series: A profile of Alan H. DeCherney, MD
 The Heart's Desire, New York Times

Personal life 
Dr. DeCherney's family emigrated from Vienna at the turn of the 20th century. His great-uncle was a longtime Chair of the Department of Otorhinology at Temple University School of Medicine, who persuaded DeCherney's father to become a family practitioner. Growing up, DeCherney's father, William worked from 6 AM to 11 PM, in the office that was also their home. Alan recalls sharing meals with his father in between seeing patients. Seeing his father working hard to help his patients kindled Alan's love for medicine from an early age.

Alan met his wife, Deanna (DeeDee), when he was looking for someone to help him with an important report. After completing the manuscript, they went on a date, and were married 4 years later. DeeDee is a artist, a talented creamiest, sculptor, and interior designer. She served as the editorial director of Design Times magazine. Now she is a senior trustee of her alma mater, The University of the Arts, in Philadelphia.

Together, the DeCherneys had 2 sons, Peter and Alexander. They now live in Maryland, and are engage in a number of charitable works.

References

Temple University alumni
Muhlenberg College alumni
Yale University faculty
Members of the National Academy of Medicine
Year of birth missing (living people)
Living people
Physicians from Pennsylvania